Ken Akamatsu (born 27 April 1995) is a Japanese footballer who plays as a left sided winger.

On 2021, He has joined Ljungskile SK in Sweden.

Career statistics

References

External links
Profile at Denver Athletics

1995 births
Living people
Denver Pioneers men's soccer players
Colorado Rapids U-23 players
New Mexico United players
People from Niigata (city)
USL League Two players
USL Championship players
Japanese footballers
Japanese expatriate footballers
Association football midfielders
Ljungskile SK players